Henry Foote may refer to:
Henry S. Foote (1804–1880), U.S. senator and governor of Mississippi
Henry Bowreman Foote (1904–1993), British general
Hezekiah William Foote (a.k.a. Henry Foote, 1813–1899), American Confederate veteran and state politician from Mississippi

See also
Henry Foot (1805–1857), English-born cricketer in Australia
Foote (surname)